Catena Artamonov is a  long chain of craters on the Moon. The name of the feature was approved by the IAU in 1976.

References

External links
 

Artamonov